Moxisylyte, also known as thymoxamine, is a drug used in urology for the treatment of erectile dysfunction. It is an α1-adrenergic antagonist. In the United Kingdom, Moxisylte is marketed as Opilon (Archimedes Pharma UK Ltd) and is used for the short-term treatment of primary Raynaud's syndrome. This is a condition where the fingers and toes become discoloured and is triggered by responses to cold, or emotional distress. Opilon tablets help by improving blood circulation to the extremities.

References

Acetate esters
Alpha-1 blockers
Hepatotoxins
Phenol ethers